A Vertiko is a kind of storage furniture, oriented to the vertical. It usually has two panelled doors. Above these, there is usually a drawer and a flat top. Often, it has a pediment as an additional feature.

Most likely its name is due to its inventor, a cabinetmaker in Berlin, Otto Vertikow, who built cabinets beginning around 1860 called "Vertikow". Vertikos have been very common in the Louis Philippe and especially in the Gründerzeit style.

See also
 Secretary desk

References

 Kitchen Cabinets Online

Cabinets (furniture)